755 Naval Air Squadron (755 NAS) was a Naval Air Squadron of the Royal Navy's Fleet Air Arm. It was first formed as a Telegraphist Air Gunner Training Squadron from 1939 to 1944, operating out of RNAS Worthy Down with a brief stint at RNAS Jersey. It then briefly reformed as a Communications Squadron at RNAS Colombo, Sri Lanka, during 1945.

History of 755 NAS

Telegraphist Air Gunner Training Squadron (1939 - 1944) 

It was initially equipped with Osprey and Shark III aircraft, however, various marks of Proctor (Ia, II, IIa, III and IV) were also operated from November 1939.

The squadron moved to the short lived RNAS Jersey on the 11 March 1940 taking its assembly of Proctor, Osprey and Shark aircraft. In early March the Admiralty had taken over Jersey airport, located at St Peter, Jersey, Channel Islands, to use as a Naval air station. However, due to the German occupation of France and the proximity to the Channel Islands, the Government concluded the Islands weren't defendable and 755 NAS moved back to Worthy Down on the 31 May 1940.

The squadron stopped using Osprey at the beginning of 1941, but from July onwards it was also equipped with Lysander TT.III and flew these alongside the Proctor and  Shark during the next couple of years. In the October of 1943, the squadron swapped it's Shark for Seamew I aircraft and for the following twelve months 755 NAS TAG training, flew Lysander, Proctor and Seamew until disbanding, at RNAS Worthy Down, on the 31 October 1944.

Communications Squadron (1945) 

755 Naval Air Squadron reformed at RNAS Colombo Racecourse (HMS Bherunda), in the Cinnamon Gardens, Colombo, Sri Lanka, on the 24 March 1945, as a Communications Squadron. It was equipped with Expeditor C.2 aircraft, which it operated throughout its existence. The squadron disbanded at Colombo on the 31 October 1945.

Aircraft flown 

755 Naval Air Squadron has flown a number of different aircraft types, including:
Hawker Osprey (May 1939 - Jan 1941)
Blackburn Shark Mk III (May 1939 - Oct 1943)
Percival P.28 Proctor IA (Nov 1939 - Oct 1944)
Percival P.30 Proctor II (Nov 1939 - Oct 1944)
Percival P.34 Proctor III (Nov 1939 - Oct 1944)
Percival P.31 Proctor IV (Nov 1939 - Oct 1944)
Westland Lysander TT Mk.III (Jul 1941 - Oct 1944)
Curtiss SO3C-2C Seamew I (Oct 1943 - Oct 1944)
Beech C-45F Expeditor II (May 1945 - Oct 1945)

Naval Air Stations  

755 Naval Air Squadron operated from a number of naval air stations of the Royal Navy, in England, the Channel Islands and overseas in Sri Lanka:
Royal Naval Air Station WORTHY DOWN (24 May 1939 - 11 March 1940)
Royal Naval Air Station JERSEY (11 March 1940 - 31 May 1940)
Royal Naval Air Station WORTHY DOWN (31 May 1940 - 31 October 1944)
Royal Naval Air Station COLOMBO RACECOURSE (24 March 1945 - 31 October 1945)

Commanding Officers 

List of commanding officers of 755 Naval Air Squadron with month and year of appointment and end:
Lt-Cdr R. A. Peyton RN (May 1939-Jul 1939)
Lt-Cdr O. S. Stevinson, RN (Jul 1939-Mar 1940)
Lt-Cdr H. P. Sears, RN (Mar 1940-Mar 1941)
Lt-Cdr (A) T. Coates, RNVR (Mar 1941-Dec 1941)
Lt-Cdr (A) R. H. Ovey, RNVR (Dec 1941-Jan 1942)
Lt-Cdr (A) J. J. Dykes, RNVR (Jan 1942-Jun 1944)
Lt-Cdr (A) W. H. C. Blake, RNVR (Jun 1944-Oct 1944)
Lt-Cdr J. G. O. Sullivan, RNZNVR (Mar 1945-Sep 1945)
Lt-Cdr R. J. Griffith, RNZNVR (Sep 1945-Oct 1945)

References

Citations

Bibliography

700 series Fleet Air Arm squadrons
Military units and formations established in 1939
Military units and formations of the Royal Navy in World War II